The 1962 Indian general election polls in United Andhra Pradesh were held for 43 seats in the state. The result was a victory for the Indian National Congress which won 34 out of 43 seats.

Voting and Results

Results by Alliance

United Andhra Pradesh

See also 
Elections in Andhra Pradesh

References

External links
 Website of Election Commission of India
 CNN-IBN Lok Sabha Election History

1962 elections in India
 Indian general elections in Andhra Pradesh
1960s in Andhra Pradesh